Arthur Hoare (16 September 1840 – 26 December 1896) was an English amateur cricketer. Hoare was a right-handed batsman,  who played in first-class cricket matches for both Sussex County Cricket Club and Kent County Cricket Club. He played in a number of non-first-class matches for teams such as MCC between 1863 and 1883.

Hoare was born at Withyham in Sussex in 1840. He made his first-class debut for Sussex against Kent in 1869 at Tunbridge Wells before going on to play for Kent in 1871 against WG Grace's XI at Maidstone. He made his final first-class appearance cricket for Sussex against Yorkshire in 1873 at Sheffield.

He died at Edenbridge in Kent in December 1896, aged 56.

References

External links

1840 births
1896 deaths
People from Withyham
English cricketers
Sussex cricketers
Kent cricketers